The jugum penis or pollutions ring was an anti-masturbatory device developed in the 18th century.  It consisted of a steel clip with serrated teeth that could be attached to the penis to deter its unwanted erection.  It is one of many devices from the 1700s designed to prevent masturbation and to cure an illness that was then called spermatorrhoea.

References

Physical restraint
Male masturbation
Opposition to masturbation
Victorian culture